Abort can mean:

Termination
The early termination of some process or relationship:
Abort (computing), to terminate a computer processing or data transfer activity
Aeronautics, a last-minute decision to cancel a landing attempt is referred to as a go-around or an aborted landing
Abortion, the termination of pregnancy
Late-term abortion at an advanced stage of gestation
Abortion debate, ongoing debate surrounding abortion
Paper abortion (also known as a financial abortion or a statutory abort), the proposed ability of a biological father, before the birth of the child, to opt out of any rights, privileges, and responsibilities toward the child, including financial support

Spaceflight, particularly a mode resulting in the return of the spacecraft to Earth:
Apollo abort modes
Space Shuttle abort modes

Arts, entertainment, and media
Abort (album), a 1991 album by the band Tribe
Abort (film), a 1970 Norwegian film

Other uses
Abort, antiquated German for a toilet